Alain Fauconnier (born 20 February 1945) is a French politician and a former member of the Senate of France. He represented the Aveyron department as a member of the Socialist Party.

References
Page on the Senate website

1945 births
Living people
French Senators of the Fifth Republic
Socialist Party (France) politicians
Senators of Aveyron